This article presents lists of the literary events and publications in 1593.

Events
Ongoing – London theatres remain closed for almost the whole year as a result of the previous year's outbreak of bubonic plague. In the summer, Edward Alleyn and other actors make a provincial tour. Some performances take place in the winter, when plague tends to abate. Lord Strange's Men act three times in January a play called Titus – perhaps Shakespeare's Titus Andronicus.
After April – William Shakespeare's Venus and Adonis probably becomes his first published work, printed from his own manuscript. In his lifetime it will be his most frequently reprinted work: at least nine times.
May 5 – "Dutch church libel" bills posted in London threaten Protestant refugees from France and the Netherlands, alluding to Christopher Marlowe's plays.
May 12 – The English dramatist Thomas Kyd is arrested over the "Dutch church libel". "Atheist" literature found in his home is claimed to be Marlowe's.
May 18 – A warrant for the arrest of Christopher Marlowe is issued. On May 20 he presents himself to the Privy Council.
May 29 – The Welsh-born Protestant John Penry is executed for involvement in the Marprelate Controversy.
May 30 – Christopher Marlowe is stabbed to death by a speculator, Ingram Frizer, in a dispute over a bill at a lodging house in Deptford kept by the widow Eleanor Bull.

New books

Prose
Bible of Kralice, first complete translation of Bible into Czech
Fray Juan de Plasencia – Doctrina Christiana, first book published in the Philippines, in Spanish and Tagalog
John Eliot – Ortho-epia Gallica
Claudius Hollyband (Claude de Sainliens) – A Dictionarie French and English
Richard Hooker – Of the Lawes of Ecclesiastical Politie
Antonio Possevino – Bibliotheca selecta

Drama
Daniel Cramer – Plagium
Thomas Kyd (probably, perhaps with Shakespeare) – The Raigne of King Edward the Third (approximate date)
George Peele – Famous Chronicle of King Edward the First
George Peele (possibly) – The Life and Death of Jack Straw (first published)

Poetry

Barnabe Barnes – Parthenophil and Parthenophone
Anthony Chute – Beauty Dishonoured, written under the title of Shore's wife
Michael Drayton
Idea: The Shepherd's Garland
The Legend of Piers Gaveston
William Shakespeare – Venus and Adonis
Thomas Watson (posthumously, as T. W.) – The Tears of Fancie, or Love Disdained (sonnets)

Births
April 3 – George Herbert, Welsh-born poet (died 1633)
May 20 – Salomo Glassius, German theologian (died 1656)
Unknown date – Robert Creighton, Scottish classicist, politician and bishop (died 1672)
Approximate year – Aodh Buidhe Mac an Bhaird (Hugh Ward), Irish poet and hagiographer (died 1635)

Deaths
January 12 – Amadis Jamyn, French poet (born 1538)
February 6 – Jacques Amyot, French translator (born 1513)
May 30 – Christopher Marlowe, English dramatist and poet (born 1564)
August 19 – Antonio Veneziano, Italian poet writing in Sicilian (born 1543)
Unknown date – Jeong Cheol, Korean poet and statesman (born 1536)

References

 
Years of the 16th century in literature